The Acasta class (in September 1913 re-designated the K class) was a class of twenty destroyers built for the Royal Navy under the Naval Programme of 1911 - 1912 that saw service during World War I. They were the last class of Royal Navy destroyers to have mixed names with no systematic theme (see naming conventions for destroyers of the Royal Navy for more information.) When the class was designated as "K", names beginning with that letter were allocated to the ships but never used.  The class saw extensive wartime service and seven were lost, including four at the Battle of Jutland.

Design
Previous  weapons had been of the breech-loading (BL) type. The 4-in guns were shipped one on the forecastle and one at the stern, as in the Acheron class, while the third was variously sited on the centreline between the two torpedo tubes or abaft both. All ships had three funnels, the foremost being tall and narrow, the second short and wide and the third level with the second but narrower. The foremost torpedo tube was sited between the second and third funnels, a distinctive feature of this class.

While Ardent novel construction seems to have been a success, no more destroyers were built for the Royal Navy using longitudinal framing until the J-class destroyers in the 1930s.

Service
After Jutland the remainder of the flotilla moved to the Humber and then to Portsmouth by the end of 1916, before dispersing, some ships to the 6th Destroyer Flotilla and the Dover Patrol and the remainder to Devonport. All survivors of the war were sold out of service for scrapping by 1921.

Ships

Admiralty K class

K-class Builders' specials

Notes

References

Bibliography
 Brown, David K., The Grand Fleet: Warship Design and Development 1906–1922. Barnsley, UK: Seaforth Publishing, 2010. .
 Maurice Cocker, Destroyers of the Royal Navy, 1893-1981, 1983, Ian Allan 
 Friedman, Norman, British Destroyers: From Earliest Days to the Second World War, Barnsley, UK: Seaforth Publishing, 2009. .

External links

 
Destroyer classes
Ship classes of the Royal Navy
World War I destroyers of the United Kingdom